Yves Christian Victor Delacour (15 March 1930 – 14 March 2014) was a French rower who competed in the 1956 Summer Olympics.

In 1956 he was a crew member of the French boat which won the bronze medal in the coxless four event.

References

1930 births
2014 deaths
French male rowers
Olympic rowers of France
Rowers at the 1956 Summer Olympics
Olympic bronze medalists for France
Olympic medalists in rowing
Medalists at the 1956 Summer Olympics
20th-century French people